Makibefo is a 1999 Malagasy black-and-white drama film written and directed by Alexander Abela. The director filmed the movie near the town of Faux Cap, Madagascar, with a single technical assistant. With the exception of an English-speaking narrator, all the roles are played by indigenous Antandroy people (few of whom had ever seen a movie before) who performed a largely improvised story based on William Shakespeare's Macbeth set in a remote fishing village.

Plot

Two Antandroy men, Makibefo and Bakoua, encounter a witch doctor as they escort a prisoner across the desert back to their village. The witch doctor prophesizes a series of future events, including Makibefo's role as the destined king of his people. On their return to the village, Makibefo sees the witch doctor's prophecies begin to come true. He shares the prophecies with his wife, and she goads him into killing their king, Danikany. Makibefo becomes the new king, but ambition and fear drive him to kill others in the village that might threaten his position. He eventually faces a revolt by the families and friends of his victims.

Cast
Martin Zia as Makibefo (based on Macbeth)
Neoliny Dety as Valy Makibefo (Lady Macbeth)
Jean-Félix as Danikany (Duncan)
Bien Rasoanan Tenaina as Malikomy (Malcolm)
Jean-Noël as Makidofy (Macduff)	
Randina Arthur as Bakoua (Banquo)
Boniface as Kidoure (Thane of Cawdor) 
Victor Raobelina as the witch doctor 
Gilbert Laumord as the storyteller

Reception

Variety reviewed Makibefo positively, calling it  "an entirely fresh response to Shakespeare that should attract both fans of the Bard and B&W cinema."

References

External links

2001 drama films
2001 films
Films based on Macbeth
Films set in Madagascar
Malagasy-language films
Malagasy drama films
English-language Malagasy films
2001 directorial debut films
Films about witch doctors
Films about prophets